Lieksan Hurtat is an ice hockey team from Lieksa, Finland, playing in the Suomi-sarja league. It plays its home matches in Lieksan jäähalli.

External links
 Official website

Lieksa
Ice hockey teams in Finland